Ladoga Lacus is a geographical feature on Saturn's largest moon, Titan, named after Lake Ladoga, Russia.
It is one of a number of "methane lakes" found in Titan's north polar region.  

The lake, detected in 2004 by the Cassini space probe, is composed of liquid ethane and methane.

Notes

References

Lakes of Titan (moon)